Austroleucon is a genus of hooded shrimps within the family Leuconidae. There are currently 3 species assigned to the genus.

Species 

 Austroleucon adiazetos 
 Austroleucon dolosolevis 
 Austroleucon levis

References 

Cumacea
Malacostraca genera